Middendorf's, also known as Middendorf, is a Louisiana seafood restaurant, considered a local institution.

History

Middendorf's was opened in 1934 during the Great Depression by a German couple named Josie and Louis Middendorf.  The restaurant was passed down through two generations of the family.  In September 2006, a year after Hurricane Katrina, the Lamonte family, the then second generation owners, sold the restaurant to German born chef, Horst Pfeifer, and his wife, Karen.  The Pfeifers had just lost their five star New Orleans restaurant, Bella Luna, to the winds from the hurricane and from subsequent looting.  Since purchasing the restaurant, the Pfeifers have preserved the traditional menu, which includes a mixture of three distinct cuisines: Creole, Cajun, and Southern.  Its most famous dish is the thin fried catfish, which Southern Living magazine has declared, "Possibly the best fried fish in the world."
The restaurant has been referenced in popular novels, including "The Sweet Potato Queen's Big-Ass Cookbook and Financial Planner" and Carl Hiaasen's "Double Whammy".

Location
Middendorf's is located 40 miles northwest of New Orleans near Manchac.  To the south of Middendorf's is Pass Manchac, a seven-mile-long serpentining natural canal that connects lakes Maurepas and Pontchartrain.  On the north side is the Amite River.  The two lakes and two rivers form the boundaries for the hourglass-shaped island named Jones Island.  Jones Island is a depleted cypress swamp, whose cypress trees were harvested by loggers from 1897 to 1952.

A second location opened in Slidell, Louisiana on the restaurant's 85th anniversary in 2019

Surviving hurricanes
Middendorf's escaped Hurricane Katrina and Rita with little damage.  

During  Hurricane Ike, however, in 2008, the restaurant was inundated with four feet of water after a ten foot storm surge on the western shores of Lake Pontchartrain.  This high surge was the result of Ike's extremely large wind field and the persistent east-southeast winds that drove water into Pass Manchac.  The hurricane was never within 200 miles of the area, yet this was the highest storm surge since the Hurricane of 1915, which destroyed the logging settlements of Frenier and Ruddock along the western shores of Lake Pontchartrain.  The old restaurant was inundated at the water's highest point.  

As a result of the flooding from Ike, the future of the old building is uncertain.  The newer building reopened for the first time since the flood on October 8, 2008.

In August 2012, the restaurant suffered once again with Hurricane Isaac, which brought flooding and more damage.

The Manchac Race

In 2009, the restaurant sponsored  and  race called Middendorf's Manchac Race for the first time.  It had been preceded in the 1990s by Swamp Runs which began in nearby Ponchatoula and ended with refreshments at the restaurant. Runners ran along old Highway 51.

See also
 Manchac, Louisiana

References

External links 

 

Restaurants in Louisiana
Buildings and structures in Tangipahoa Parish, Louisiana
Tourist attractions in Tangipahoa Parish, Louisiana
Restaurants established in 1934
1934 establishments in Louisiana